Barsa-Kelmes Nature Reserve (Barsakelmes memlekettık tabiği qoryğy) is a wildlife refuge on the former island of Barsa-Kelmes in Kyzylorda Region of Kazakhstan, in Central Asia.

It was founded in 1939. The island on which the reserve is situated is in the Aral Sea. Its territory is around 300 square kilometres. Some 250 species of plants constitute its flora. Its fauna numbers 56 species of animals, and includes, among others, the Transcaspian wild ass, goitered gazelle, corsac fox, and Eurasian wolf. There are 203 bird species in the area.

References

External links
a Kazakhstani tourist site, from which the original text of this article was lifted
Photo gallery 1
Photo gallery 2
Чернобров В. А. Остров Барсакельмес

Nature reserves in Kazakhstan
Kyzylorda Region
Aral Sea
Protected areas established in 1939
1939 establishments in the Kazakh Soviet Socialist Republic